Berezovka is a rural locality (a selo) and the administrative center of Beryozovsky Selsoviet of Krasnoshchyokovsky District, Altai Krai, Russia. The population was 1,318 as of 2016. It has 19 streets.

Geography 
Berezovka is located 36 km north of Krasnoshchyokovo (the district's administrative centre) by road. Verkh-Kamyshenka is the nearest rural locality.

References 

Rural localities in Krasnoshchyokovsky District